Le Fantasque ("The capricious one") was the lead ship of her class of six large destroyers ("Torpedo-boat destroyer") built for the  (French Navy) during the 1930s. The ship entered service in 1935 and participated in the Second World War. Le Fantasque and two of her sister ships were based in Dakar, French West Africa, to patrol the Central Atlantic for several months in late 1939. They returned to Metropolitan France before the end of the year and were transferred to French Algeria in late April 1940 in case Italy decided to enter the war. She screened French cruisers several times as they unsuccessfully hunted for Italian ships after Italy declared war in June.

After most of French Equatorial Africa had declared for Free France in August, Le Fantasque and two of her sisters escorted a force of cruisers sent to Dakar in September to intimidate the colonies into rejoining Vichy France. The British and Free French sent a force to persuade French West Africa to join the Free French and the Battle of Dakar began when the garrison rejected their entreaties. The Vichy destroyers were given a defensive role, laying a smoke screen to protect the cruisers as they engaged the British ships. Le Fantasque was still in Dakar when French West Africa joined the Free French in late 1942. She was then modernized in the United States, in early 1943 and returned to the Mediterranean mid-year where she spent the next year searching for Axis shipping with two of her sisters. In between raids, the ship supported the French occupation of Corsica in September and provided naval gunfire support during Operation Dragoon, the invasion of Southern France in mid-1944.

After the war Le Fantasque was sent to French Indochina in late 1945–1946 to provide support for the French forces there. After returning to Metropolitan France in mid-1946, she was intermittently active until mid-1950. Deemed uneconomical to repair at that time, the ship was placed in reserve until she was stricken in 1953. Le Fantasque was scrapped in 1958.

Design and description
The Le Fantasque-class ships were designed to counter the fast Italian  light cruisers and one member of the class, exceeding  during trials to set a world record for a conventionally hulled ship. Le Fantasque was powered by two Rateau-Bretagne geared steam turbines, each driving one propeller shaft, using steam provided by four water-tube boilers. During her sea trials on 11 July 1935, her turbines provided  and she reached  for a single hour. The crew of the Le Fantasque class consisted of 11 officers and 221 crewmen in peacetime and the number of the latter increasing to 254 in wartime.

The main armament of the Le Fantasques consisted of five Canon de  Modèle 1929 guns in single mounts, one superfiring pair fore and aft of the superstructure and the fifth gun abaft the aft funnel. Their anti-aircraft armament consisted of two Canon de  Modèle 1925 guns in single mounts positioned amidships and four Hotchkiss Mitrailleuse de  CA Modèle 1929 machine guns in two twin-gun mounts aft of the 37 mm mounts. The ships carried three above-water triple sets of  torpedo tubes; the aft mount could traverse to both sides, but the forward mounts were positioned one on each broadside. A pair of depth charge chutes were built into their stern; these housed a total of sixteen  depth charges with another dozen available in the torpedo magazine. The ship could also be fitted with rails capable of handling 40 naval mines.

Modifications
In December 1938–January 1939, the bridge wings were enlarged to accommodate the Hotchkiss machine guns on Le Fantasque. After the war began in September, 200 kg depth-charge stowage increased to 48 and a pair of rails were installed on the stern for  depth charges. Each rail could accommodate 3 depth charges and 15 more were stored in the magazine. In early 1940 twin-gun 37 mm mounts replaced the single-gun mounts. Before the ship sailed to Dakar in September, a single Browning 13.2-millimeter anti-aircraft machine gun was installed on top of the aft ammunitions hoists; a second gun was added in the same location in February 1941. Later that year or in 1942, the Hotchkiss machine guns were transferred to new platforms on the center superstructure and their former positions were occupied by the Brownings. During her 1941 refit in Oran, French Algeria, Le Fantasque had her aft superstructure remodeled in early to create a platform atop the aft ammunition hoists and platforms on each side for 37 mm guns. The twin-gun mounts was repositioned on the upper platform and one of the lower platforms while the other one was occupied by a single mount as there was a shortage of twin-gun mounts. In May 1942 the ship was provided with an Alpha-2 sonar system in cases pending the modification of the hull to accommodate the required flexible underwater dome.

Construction and career
Ordered on 17 November 1930 as part of the 1930 Naval Program, Le Fantasque was laid down by the Arsenal de Lorient on 16 November 1931. She was launched on 15 March 1934, commissioned on 15 November 1935, completed on 10 March 1936 and entered service on 1 May. Completion was delayed when the ship ran aground while entering Lorient and badly damaged her keel and propellers. When the Le Fantasques entered service they were assigned to the newly formed 8th and 10th Light Divisions which were later redesignated as scout divisions; both divisions were assigned to the 2nd Light Squadron in Brest.

Albert Lebrun, President of France, inaugurated the new building of the Naval Academy in Brest and reviewed the 2nd Squadron on 30 May 1936, including Le Fantasque, L'Audacieux, L'Indomptable, and Le Terrible. Between 15 January and 26 February, the 2nd Light Squadron cruised as far south as Conakry, French West Africa. On 27 May 1937, Alphonse Gasnier-Duparc, Minister of the Navy, reviewed the fleet, including all of the Le Fantasques.

World War II
Both the 8th and 10th Scout Divisions were assigned to the  when war was declared in September 1939; it made only a single sortie as a complete unit on 2–6 September when it responded to an erroneous report that German ships had left port. Afterwards it was dispersed into smaller groups to search for German commerce raiders and blockade runners. The 10th Scout Division, together with British ships, was assigned to Force X that was based in Dakar, French West Africa from 10 October to 18 November. On 25 November, together with Le Terrible and the heavy cruiser , she captured the  German merchantman . The division escorted Strasbourg and the heavy cruiser  back to France on 18 November. Le Fantasque took part in a sortie by the  into the Western Mediterranean on 12–13 June, after Italy declared war on the Allies on the 10th. Le Fantasque then began escorting convoys evacuating personnel from mainland France to French North Africa and escorted cruisers fruitlessly searching for Italian cruisers on 23–24 June after an erroneous report that they were at sea. After the British attack on Mers-el-Kébir on 3 July, the ship escorted the Algiers-based cruisers that failed to rendezvous with Strasbourg after she escaped from Mers-el-Kébir and later arrived at Toulon.

By the end of August, all of French Equatorial Africa had joined Free France, with the exception of French Gabon. In response, the Germans and Italians authorized the Vichy French to send ships to the Gulf of Guinea to bring the rebellious colonies back under control. The 4th Cruiser Division of three light cruisers, escorted by the 10th Scout Division, was chosen and the ships were designated as Force Y. They departed Toulon on 9 September and departed Casablanca, French Morocco, on the 12th after refueling. Le Fantasque, delayed by machinery problems, finally reached Dakar on 20 September, a day after her sisters. A powerful British and Free French force was already en route to Dakar; their mission was to rally it to the Free French or to conquer it. The Vichy French garrison refused General Charles de Gaulle's appeal to join the Free French on the 23rd and opened fire on the British ships. The Vichy destroyers were tasked to make a continuous smoke screen to protect the cruisers as they maneuvered to avoid British shells; Le Fantasque was not damaged during the battle. She was refitted at Oran from 20 July 1941 to 27 January 1942.

Free French operations
After the Allies invaded French North Africa on 8 November, French West Africa and its fleet, including Le Fantasque and her sister Le Terrible, joined the Allies on 24 November. The sisters steamed to Casablanca, French Morocco, where their light anti-aircraft guns were removed on 21 January 1943 and then to the Charlestown Navy Yard in Boston to be modernized. Arriving on 21 February, Le Fantasques refit lasted until 25 June and included the addition of a British Type 128D ASDIC system, installation of SA early-warning and SF surface search radars, the removal of her aft torpedo tubes and the conversion of some boiler feedwater tanks to fuel oil to improve her range. Her AA armament now consisted of eight  Bofors guns in a quadruple mount superfiring over the aft 138.6 mm guns, and two twin mounts forward of the aft funnel; eight  Oerlikon guns were also added in single mounts, four on the sides of the bridge and the remaining guns on platforms on the aft superstructure. After the refit, she was reclassified as a light cruiser and the 10th Scout Division was redesignated as the 10th Light Cruiser Division. Despite the modernization work in Boston, the ships' turbines were prone to frequent breakdowns during heavy use and required a lot of maintenance. To compensate, the French adopted a policy of keeping two of the three ships in the 10th Light Cruiser Division (LCD) operational at any one time while the third ship was repaired.

The ship arrived back at Casablanca on 18 July and then in Algiers a week later after which Le Fantasque escorted a few convoys. Together with Le Terrible, she sortied in search of Axis shipping off Scalea, Italy, on 20–21 August, where the ships engaged Italian motor torpedo boats and then in the Bay of Naples on 21–22 August. The sisters were among the escorts for the British Force H during the Salerno landings (Operation Avalanche) on 9 September and helped to shoot down a German aircraft that night. As the Germans began evacuating Corsica on 10 September, the Allies began landing troops. The ship was lightly damaged when she ran aground at Ajaccio on her last mission. On 17 October Le Fantasque and Le Terrible departed Oran on 17 October to rendezvous with the battleship  at the Azores and escorted her to Mers-el-Kébir. The following month, the sisters conducted two unsuccessful raids searching for German shipping in the Aegean Sea on 19–24 November in conjunction with the British light cruiser . On 24 December, she intercepted the German cargo ship Nicoline Maersk and forced the freighter to beach herself to avoid capture. Shortly afterwards the sisters were transferred to  the Azores to hunt for German blockade runners (Operation Stonewall). After the Allied victory during the Battle of the Bay of Biscay on the 28th, the sisters sailed to Gibraltar, but only stayed a few days before returning to the Azores to continue their search for blockade runners.

During the Allied landings at Anzio, Italy, on 22 January, Le Fantasque carried out a diversionary bombardment of Civitavecchia and then bombarded Formia and Terracina the following day. In late February the 10th LCD was tasked to conduct deep raids in the Adriatic in search of German shipping. The first two raids on 27–29 February were unsuccessful, but on the night of 29 February/1 March they encountered a heavily escorted cargo ship. Le Fantasque and Le Malin sank the freighter and heavily damaged the torpedo boat  and a corvette in the Battle of Ist. Further sweeps were fruitless although the cruisers bombarded Zante on the night of 7/8 March. On the night of 18/19 March, Le Fantasque and Le Terrible encountered a German convoy and sank two Siebel ferries and damaged two other ferries. Both cruisers were struck by return fire that wounded eight men aboard Le Fantasque and one crewman on Le Terrible. The ships were refitted and then transferred to Alexandria, Egypt, to conduct patrols south of Crete and in the Aegean in April where they had no engagements other than a bombardment of Kos. Transferred back to the Adriatic in June, Le Fantasque and Le Terrible sank the small oil tanker  on the 17th. On 15 August, the 10th LCD provided naval gunfire support during Operation Dragoon, the Allied landing in Provence, Le Fantasque firing 280 shells from her main guns. Together with Le Terrible, Le Fantasque escorted Richelieu to Toulon on 1 October.

Postwar activities
Le Fantasque arrived in Saigon, French Indochina, on 27 October 1945 and alternated with Le Triomphant in providing gunfire support to the French garrison at Nha Trang and then supporting French forces on the coast of the Gulf of Tonkin. The sisters participated in a naval review in Ha Long Bay on 24 March 1946. Le Fantasque then made a show the flag cruise to Japan in May–June and departed Saigon for Metropolitan France on 4 July. On 1 January 1947, the 10th LCD was combined with the 4th Division of Cruisers into the Cruiser Group; during this time, only two of the four surviving ships of the class were active at any one time because of a shortage of trained personnel. Le Fantasque was active in March–September before beginning a major refit that lasted until May 1948. She was recommissioned on 12 July and remained on active duty until decommissioned in August 1950. The ship was supposed to begin a refit in Bizerte, French Tunisia, but this was canceled because her condition was too poor and she was placed in the reserve. All of the Le Fantasque-class ships were reclassified as escort destroyers, 1st class on 1 July 1951 and then as fast escorts in 1953. Le Fantasque was towed to Saint-Mandrier-sur-Mer in September 1953, stricken from the Navy List that year and scrapped in 1958.

References

References

External links 

 Le Fantasque-Class destroyer 
 CONTRE-TORPILLEURS de classe "Le Fantasque"   
 Le Fantasque - tarrif.net 
 Le Fantasque - uboat.net 
 CoatneyHistory:  Le Fantasque, postwar and digitally altered to 1940 configuration, from U.S. Office of Naval Intelligence recognition manual ONI 200, 1950

Le Fantasque-class destroyers
World War II destroyers of France
World War II cruisers of France
1934 ships